David Clifford Wickersham (September 27, 1935 – June 18, 2022) was an American baseball pitcher who played ten seasons in Major League Baseball (MLB).  He played for the Kansas City Athletics, Detroit Tigers, Pittsburgh Pirates, and Kansas City Royals from 1960 to 1969.

Early life
Wickersham was born in Erie, Pennsylvania, on September 27, 1935.  He attended high school in East Springfield, where he excelled in several sports.  He then attended Ohio University, where he played with the Ohio Bobcats for two years.  He was signed as an amateur free agent by the Pittsburgh Pirates before the 1955 season.

Career

Wickersham played six seasons in the minor leagues from 1955 to 1960.  He was acquired by the Kansas City Athletics in the 1959 minor league draft.  He made his MLB debut for the franchise on September 18, 1960, nine days before his 25th birthday, pitching two innings, giving up an earned run, and striking out one in a 9–2 loss against the Cleveland Indians.  In 1962, he posted an 11–4 win–loss record and led American League pitchers with a .733 winning percentage, and went 12–15 with a 3.78 earned run average (ERA) the following year. He was traded along with Jerry Lumpe and Ed Rakow from the Athletics to the Detroit Tigers for Rocky Colavito, Bob Anderson and $50,000 on November 18, 1963.

Wickersham enjoyed his most productive season for Detroit in 1964, when he went 19–12 with a 3.44 ERA and posted career-numbers in strikeouts (164), starts (36), complete games (11), appearances (40), and innings pitched (254.0). He was in consideration that year in the American League MVP vote. His 19 victories also was a career-mark, missing a 20-win season due to an ejection in his last start from a ballgame which was tied 1–1 in the 7th inning. Mickey Lolich relieved him and earned a 4–2 win.  Wickersham was ejected after calling time out three times to try to keep a base runner from advancing as Norm Cash argued with the call by Bill Valentine.  Valentine later expressed regret for the call, saying he had been "too impulsive" in his ejection.  However, Wickersham wrote him a letter in 2004, reassuring the ump that he made the right call, in an attempt to relieve him of his burden.

Wickersham also pitched for the Pittsburgh Pirates and Kansas City Royals.  He was traded by the Tigers to the Pirates for Dennis Ribant on November 28, 1967.  He played his final major league game on July 26, 1969, at the age of 33.  Over his 10-season MLB career, Wickersham posted a 68–57 record with 638 strikeouts and a 3.66 ERA in 1,123 innings, including 29 complete games, five shutouts and 18 saves.  Notably, he was one of three players (along with fellow pitchers Aurelio Monteagudo and Moe Drabowsky) to play for both Kansas City-based major league teams, the Athletics and Royals.

In 1989, Wickersham was inducted into the Pennsylvania Sports Hall of Fame.

Personal life
Wickersham married Carol Sue Larson in 1964.  They remained married for 48 years until her death from cancer in 2012.  Together, they had four children: Davey, Carey, Mandy, and Matthew.

Wickersham died on June 18, 2022, at the age of 86.

References

External links

 Dave Wickersham - Baseballbiography.com

1935 births
2022 deaths
Baseball players from Pennsylvania
Beaumont Pirates players
Burlington-Graham Pirates players
Columbus Jets players
Columbus/Gastonia Pirates players
Detroit Tigers players
Grand Forks Chiefs players
Kansas City Athletics players
Kansas City Royals players
Lincoln Chiefs players
Major League Baseball pitchers
Omaha Royals players
Pittsburgh Pirates players
Salt Lake City Bees players
Shreveport Sports players
Sportspeople from Erie, Pennsylvania